William Penn is an unincorporated community in Washington County, Texas, United States. It is located at the intersection of Farm to Market Road 390 and County Road 75, approximately 12 miles northeast of Brenham.

History 
William Penn was originally a Mexican land grant to Issac Jackson, who later sold the land to John G. Pitts. In 1849, John C. Eldridge settled in the area, who named the town after a steamboat. 

In the 1850s, Robert Hallum constructed a house in the area which still stands. In the 1860s a Lutheran church was built followed by a cemetery. A post office was built in 1873 that remained active until 1916. In 1876, the church built a school. By the 1890s, William Penn's economy was almost exclusively agricultural with a commercial sector and a wagon maker. In the 1910s, William Penn had two cotton gins, one of which did not close down until 1988. Ranching is the only remaining commercial activity in the area. The estimated population is 100.

Education 
The Brenham Independent School District serves area students.

Notable people 
 Bedford G. Guy, state legislator during reconstruction
 Gus Franklin Mutscher, state legislator

References

Unincorporated communities in Washington County, Texas